The 1969 All-Ireland Under-21 Football Championship was the sixth staging of the All-Ireland Under-21 Football Championship since its establishment by the Gaelic Athletic Association in 1964.

Derry entered the championship as the defending champions, however, they were defeated in the Ulster Championship.

On 14 September 1969, Antrim won the championship following a 1-8 to 0-10 defeat of Roscommon in the All-Ireland final. This was their first and only All-Ireland title.

Results

All-Ireland Under-21 Football Championship

Semi-finals

Final

Statistics

Miscellaneous

 Laois win the Leinster title for the first time in their history.

References

1969
All-Ireland Under-21 Football Championship